Nala is a king in Hindu mythology.

Nala may also refer to:

Places
Nala, Nepal, a region
Nala, Pakistan, a village
Nala Local Municipality, an administrative area in Free State, South Africa
Nala (Tanzanian ward), an administrative ward in Dodoma Region
Nala River, Vanua Levu, Fiji
Nala block, community development block in Jamtara district, Jharkhand, India
Nala, Jamtara, village in Jharkhand, India
Nala (Vidhan Sabha constituency), an assembly constituency in the Indian state of Jharkhand
 NALA, North America and Latin America

People
Nala Damajanti (fl. 1864–1894), stage name of a snake charmer who toured with P. T. Barnum and performed at the Folies Bergère
Nala dynasty of east-central India in the 6th century

Other uses
Nullah, a South Asian term for watercourse or drainage trench
Nala (Ramayana), a monkey in Hindu mythology
Nala (The Lion King), a character in Disney's The Lion King franchise
KRI Nala (363), an Indonesian naval vessel
NALA Films, a film production company
Nala, a genus of earwigs in family Labiduridae
NaLA (National Lifeline Association), a non-profit that supports Lifeline ETCs, providers, recipients, distributors, and advocates.

See also
Nalas, a village in West Azerbaijan Province, Iran